Grace Heritage Center (formerly Grace Episcopal Church) is a church building located at 811 South Main Street in Georgetown, Texas, United States. Built in 1881, the building is the city's oldest wood-framed church.

The building was added to the National Register of Historic Places on April 29, 1986, and later removed on February 17, 1999.

See also
 National Register of Historic Places listings in Williamson County, Texas

References

External links
 

1881 establishments in Texas
Churches completed in 1881
Churches in Texas
Former National Register of Historic Places in Texas
National Register of Historic Places in Williamson County, Texas